Ernst Foreth (24 February 1925 – 9 March 1999) was an Austrian footballer. He played in three matches for the Austria national football team in 1956.

References

External links
 
 

1925 births
1999 deaths
Austrian footballers
Austria international footballers
Place of birth missing
Association football defenders
FC Admira Wacker Mödling players